The Esperanto Bridge is a pedestrian bridge in Bydgoszcz, Poland.

It was named after Esperanto on the 125th anniversary of the language. The naming ceremony took place on October 27, 2012.

References

Esperanto in Poland
Landmarks in Poland
Pedestrian bridges in Poland